Mayumi Pacheco (born 25 August 1998) is an English footballer, who plays as a defender for FA Women's Super League club Aston Villa.

Career
Pacheco made a failed bid to join the youth team of FA WSL 1 side Liverpool in 2013 by participating in the club's trial. She 
managed to secure a place in the youth team the following year.

Pacheco began her senior career with Liverpool in 2015. She made her club debut on 25 March in a league loss to Sunderland. 11 more appearances followed during the 2015 and 2016 seasons before Pacheco left to join Doncaster Rovers Belles on loan for the remainder of the 2016 campaign. She went onto make 12 appearances and score 1 goal prior to signing a permanent contract at the beginning of 2017. In July 2018, Pacheco signed for Reading, after helping Doncaster Rover Belles win the WSL 2 title. On 8 June 2020, Reading announced that Pacheco had left the club after her contract had expired. On 10 July 2020, Pacheco signed for West Ham United. On August 16, 2021, she signed for Aston Villa FC.

Career statistics

Club
.

Honours
England U20s
FIFA U-20 Women's World Cup third place: 2018

Personal life
Pacheco was born in Ormskirk. Her mother comes from the Philippines, her father from Ormskirk, and she has two brothers.

References

External links

1998 births
Living people
English women's footballers
Filipino British sportspeople
English people of Filipino descent
British Asian footballers
Women's Super League players
Women's Championship (England) players
Liverpool F.C. Women players
Doncaster Rovers Belles L.F.C. players
People from Ormskirk
Women's association football fullbacks
Reading F.C. Women players
Aston Villa W.F.C. players
West Ham United F.C. Women players
England women's under-21 international footballers